Jarvis Hunt (August 6, 1863 - June 15, 1941) was a Chicago architect who designed a wide array of buildings, including railroad stations, suburban estates, industrial buildings, clubhouses and other structures.

Biography

Hunt was born in Weathersfield, Vermont, and attended Harvard University and the Massachusetts Institute of Technology.

He had a passion for golf and qualified for the 1904 Olympics Golf Team, but failed to make the cut. Hunt later designed the clubhouses of several clubs including the National Golf Links of America Golf Course, of which he was a founding member, and the Chicago Golf Club.

Most of his projects are associated with the United States Midwest, including the Kansas City Union Station and the Joliet Union Station. Hunt based his architectural firm in Chicago's Monadnock Building.

Hunt retired to his home in St. Petersburg, Florida in 1927. He died on June 15, 1941, in St. Petersburg.

Family life

Hunt was the son of attorney, farmer and photography pioneer Colonel Leavitt Hunt and his wife, Katherine (Jarvis) Hunt. His uncles were New York City architect Richard Morris Hunt and Boston painter William Morris Hunt, and his grandfather was U.S. Congressman Jonathan Hunt.

Hunt and his wife, the former M. Louise Coleman, had two children: Louisa Hunt McMurtry and Jarvis Hunt Jr. Jarvis Hunt and his wife later divorced, and he was awarded custody of his two children.

Projects
Vermont Building, World's Columbian Exposition, 1893
Arbor Lodge, Nebraska City, Nebraska, 1903
Chicago and Alton Depot, Marshall, Missouri, 1906
Naval Station Great Lakes, 39 original buildings, 1903-1927
Union Pacific headquarters, Omaha, Nebraska, 1910
Gulf, Colorado and Santa Fe Railway depot, Temple, Texas, 1910
Indianapolis News Building, 1910 (National Register)
Kansas City Star Building 1910 (National Register)
Joliet Union Station, 1911-13 (National Register)
16th Street Station, Oakland, California, 1912
Union Station (Kansas City), 1913 (National Register)
Commerce Trust Building, Kansas City, Missouri, 1914 (National Register)
Ayers Bank Building, Jacksonville, Illinois, 1914 (National Register)
Union Station (Dallas), 1914-1916 (National Register)
Newark Museum, 1923–26
Hecht's Department Store, Washington, D.C.
Chicago Golf Club Clubhouse, Wheaton, Illinois
Bamberger's Department Store, now 165 Halsey Street, Newark, New Jersey
National Golf Links of America Clubhouse, Southampton, New York
Walden, Estate of Cyrus H. McCormick II, Lake Forest, Illinois, 1896 (main house demolished, 1950s)

Gallery

References

Further reading

External links
 
Jarvis Hunt, architect, biography
Jarvis Hunt, list of works
 Proposal for the Reorganization of the Railway Terminals of Chicago, An Address Before the City Club of Chicago, June 5, 1913, by Jarvis Hunt, Architect
The Colony at the Chicago Golf Club, Wheaten and unincorporated DuPage County (Jarvis Hunt, c. 1898–1916), Landmarks Illinois

1863 births
1941 deaths
20th-century American architects
Harvard University alumni
Hunt family of Vermont
Massachusetts Institute of Technology alumni
Artists from Chicago
American male golfers
Olympic golfers of the United States
Golfers at the 1904 Summer Olympics
People from Weathersfield, Vermont
Golfers from Vermont
Wheaton, Illinois
American railway architects
19th-century American architects